Prauserella muralis is a Gram-positive bacterium from the genus Prauserella which has been isolated from a wall which was colonized with mold in Berlin, Germany.

References

Pseudonocardiales
Bacteria described in 2010